Duncan Robertson Napier (6 October 1871 – 24 October 1898) was a Scottish first-class cricketer and British Army officer.

The son of the Scotsman William Henry Edward Napier, he was born in October 1871 at Croydon. He was educated at Harrow School, before attending the Royal Military College, Sandhurst. He graduated from Sandhurst in 1892, being awarded the Sword of Honour for being the best cadet at Sandhurst. He entered into the Oxfordshire Light Infantry as a second lieutenant in May 1892. He made two appearances in first-class cricket for the Marylebone Cricket Club in the same month as his graduation, appearing against Lancashire and Yorkshire at Lord's. He scored 50 runs in his two matches, with a highest score of 33. Napier served with the Oxfordshire Light Infantry in British India, seeing action in the North-West Frontier Province in the Tirah campaign of 1897–98. He was seriously wounded in action during the campaign, returning to Britain where he succumbed to his injuries at Kensington in October 1898. Conversely, the Tirah memorial in Oxford records Napier as having died as a result of disease on active service.

References

External links

1871 births
1898 deaths
Cricketers from Croydon
People educated at Harrow School
Graduates of the Royal Military College, Sandhurst
Oxfordshire and Buckinghamshire Light Infantry officers
Scottish cricketers
Marylebone Cricket Club cricketers
British military personnel of the Tirah campaign
British military personnel killed in action in India
Military personnel from Surrey